Iron Bridge Lodge is a house on the Aldford Approach to Eaton Hall, Cheshire, England.  It is sited on the banks of the River Dee and is close to Aldford Iron Bridge.  The house is recorded in the National Heritage List for England as a designated Grade II listed building.

History

The lodge was built for The 1st Duke of Westminster in 1894–95 and was designed by the Chester firm of architects Douglas and Fordham.

Architecture

Iron Bridge Lodge is built in two storeys with attics and a single-storey extension, the lower storey being in red brick and the upper storey jettied and timber-framed.  The main part of the house has two bays facing the river.  In the lower storey, the left bay has a two-light mullioned window and in the right bay is a similar window with four lights.  In the upper storey each bay has a four-light oriel window with a small two-light window in the attics above.  There are two red-brick chimneys, a larger one in the centre and a smaller one at the left rear, each with blue-brick diapering and spiral moulded flues.

See also

Listed buildings in Poulton, Cheshire
List of houses and associated buildings by John Douglas

References

Grade II listed houses in Cheshire
Houses completed in 1895
Houses in Cheshire
John Douglas buildings
Timber framed buildings in Cheshire